Aneinu, also transliterated as annenu or aneynu, is a Jewish prayer added into the Chazzan's Repetition of the Shemoneh Esrei on fast days. It is also inserted into the personal Shemoneh Esrei inside of Shema Koleinu (a blessing in the Shemoneh Esrei) during the Shacharit Prayer by Sephardic Jews and during the Mincha Prayer by Ashkenazi Jews and Sephardic Jews.

Text
The standard Ashkenazi Orthodox text of Aneinu is as follows:

Jewish prayer and ritual texts
Hebrew words and phrases in Jewish prayers and blessings